The Jeanneau Poker is a French sailboat that was designed by Michel Joubert of the Joubert-Nivelt design firm, as a racer-cruiser and first built in 1972.

There was also a Flush Poker model with a lower coach house roof.

Production
The design was built by Jeanneau in France in the United States, from 1972 until 1978, with a total of 620 boats completed.

Design
The Poker is a recreational keelboat, built predominantly of fiberglass, with wood trim. It has a masthead sloop rig. The hull has a raked stem, a reverse transom, a skeg-mounted rudder and a fixed swept fin keel. It displaces  and carries  of iron ballast.

The design has sleeping accommodation for five people, with a double "V"-berth in the bow cabin, two straight settee berths in the main cabin and an aft quarter berth on the starboard side. The galley is located on the port side at the companionway ladder. The galley is equipped with a two-burner stove, an ice box and a sink. The head is located just aft of the bow cabin on the starboard side.

See also
List of sailing boat types

References

External links

Keelboats
1970s sailboat type designs
Sailing yachts
Sailboat type designs by Michel Joubert
Sailboat types built by Jeanneau